The Samsung Galaxy A54 5G is a mid-range Android-based smartphone developed and manufactured by Samsung Electronics as a part of its Galaxy 
A series. This device was announced on March 15, 2023.

Design 
The back panel and side are made of frosted plastic.

Samsung Galaxy A54 5G was removed one camera unlike predecessor.

The back of the smartphone is similar to the Samsung Galaxy A34 5G. The Galaxy A54 5G, like the Samsung Galaxy A53 5G, does not have a 3.5 mm audio jack. Unlike the predecessor it's 0.1 inch smaller display screen .Also Galaxy A54 5G has protection against moisture and dust according to the IP67 standard.

Below are USB-C connector, speaker, microphone and depending on the version slot for 1 SIM card and microSD memory card up to 1 TB or hybrid slot for 2 SIM cards.  The second microphone is located on top.  On the right side are the volume buttons and the smartphone lock button.

The smartphone is sold in 4 colors: graphite (Awesome Graphite), white (Awesome White), violet (Awesome Violet) and lime (Awesome Lime).

References

External links 
 

Samsung Galaxy
Mobile phones introduced in 2023
Android (operating system) devices
Samsung smartphones
Mobile phones with multiple rear cameras
Mobile phones with 4K video recording